Darvishabad or Dervishabad may refer to:
Darvishabad, Fars
Darvishabad, Golestan
Darvishabad, Khuzestan
Darvishabad, Firuzabad, Lorestan Province
Darvishabad, Khorramabad, Lorestan Province
Darvishabad, Selseleh, Lorestan Province
Darvishabad, Mazandaran
Darvishabad, South Khorasan
Darvishabad, West Azerbaijan